Attorney General Lavarch may refer to:

Linda Lavarch (born 1958), Attorney-General of Queensland
Michael Lavarch (born 1961), Attorney-General of Australia